, also known as  and , is a Japanese castle located in Shimabara, Hizen Province (present day Nagasaki prefecture). This five-story white building stands in stark contrast to the black Kumamoto Castle in neighboring Kumamoto Prefecture.

Description
The outer moats, some 15 meters deep and between 30–50 meters wide, extended 360 meters east-west and 1260 meters north-south, with the enclosed area divided into three baileys. The walls extended for 3900 meters and had 16 yagura of various sizes at key points. The main donjon had five stories, and a height of 33 meters, and was connected to two secondary keeps, each with three stories. In terms of scale, it was far larger than normal for a daimyō with revenues of only 40,000 koku .

History

The Arima clan, who were Kirishitan daimyō, ruled over Shimabara Domain in the late Muromachi period from Hinoe Castle and Hara Castle. After the start of the national isolation policy, the Tokugawa Bakufu banned Christianity from 1614 and replaced Arima Naozumi with Matsukura Shigemasa. Matsukura, who strictly enforced the prohibition against Christianity with mass executions, also severely raised taxes to pay for the construction of his new Shimabara Castle from 1618-1624. This oppression of the peasants was a major factor leading to the Shimabara Rebellion.

The castle came under siege during the Shimabara Rebellion, but was not damaged. It subsequently served as the seat of the Kōriki clan, who ruled Shimabara from 1638–1668, Matsudaira clan (1669–1747, 1774–1871) and Toda clan (1747–1774)

The Matsudaira daimyō remained in residence at Shimabara Castle until the Meiji Restoration of 1868. It was the seat of the local government until 1871, when the former Shimabara Domain was merged into the new Nagasaki prefecture. The keep was pulled down in 1876, as were most of the supporting structures. The third bailey became a school grounds, and most of the inner bailey was given over to farmland.

Today, only the moat and stone walls remain from the original structure. A number of the yagura were restored in 1960 and 1972, and the keep was rebuilt in 1964 in reinforced concrete as a city museum containing exhibits of the Kirishitan culture, Shimabara Rebellion and feudal period.

In 1980, a memorial museum was opened in honor of Seibo Kitamura, a noted sculptor. In 2006, the Shimabara Castle was listed one of the 100 Fine Castles of Japan by the Japan Castle Foundation.

References

External links

Shimabara Castle home page
Photo Gallery

Castles in Nagasaki Prefecture
Museums in Nagasaki Prefecture
History museums in Japan
100 Fine Castles of Japan